Peter Kraus (17 July 1932 – 15 January 2016) was a German sprinter. He competed in the men's 200 metres at the 1952 Summer Olympics.

References

1932 births
2016 deaths
Athletes (track and field) at the 1952 Summer Olympics
German male sprinters
Olympic athletes of Germany
Athletes from Berlin